Vincendo is a village on the island of Réunion, located on its southern coast.

Populated places in Réunion
Saint-Joseph, Réunion